Florina Maria Chintoan, née Bârsan (born 6 December 1985) is a Romanian handball player for Jolidon Cluj.

References

Living people
Romanian female handball players 
1985 births
Olympic handball players of Romania
Handball players at the 2008 Summer Olympics
Handball players at the 2016 Summer Olympics
Sportspeople from Cluj-Napoca